Barony may refer to:

 Barony, the peerage, office of, or territory held by a baron
 Barony, the title and land held in fealty by a feudal baron
 Barony (county division), a type of administrative or geographical division in parts of the British Isles
 Barony (Ireland), a historical subdivision of the Irish counties
 Barony (role-playing game), a 1990 tabletop RPG

See also 
 Baronet
 Baronage